The Journal of Managed Care & Specialty Pharmacy is a monthly peer-reviewed medical journal covering all aspects of managed care pharmacy. It was established in 1995 and is published by the Academy of Managed Care Pharmacy. The editor-in-chief is Laura E. Happe. According to the Journal Citation Reports, the journal has a 2014 impact factor of 2.713.

References

External links

Pharmacy in the United States
Pharmacology journals
English-language journals
Publications established in 1995
Monthly journals